Marcus Darnell Davis (born December 21, 1989) is an American football wide receiver who is currently a free agent. He was signed as an undrafted free agent by the New York Giants in 2013. He played college football at Virginia Tech.

Early years
He attended Ocean Lakes High School in Virginia Beach, Virginia. He was named first-team All-Tidewater as a quarterback by The Virginian Pilot and also was selected to the First-team All-Beach District. He was ranked as the 9th best prospect in the state of Virginia by The Roanoke Times. He was ranked as the 112th best wide receiver prospect in the country by SuperPrep.

College career

Virginia Tech

Freshman season
In his Freshman year, he only recorded 5 receptions, 125 receiving yards along with one receiving touchdown.

Sophomore season
In his Sophomore year, he had 19 receptions, 239 receiving yards and 2 receiving touchdowns.

Junior season
In his Junior year, he had 30 receptions, 510 receiving yards and 5 receiving touchdowns.

Senior season
In his Senior year, he had a career-high 51 receptions, 953 receiving yards and 5 receiving touchdowns. On December 5, 2012, he was selected as a 2012 Coaches All-ACC Honorable Mention following the season.

Professional career

2013 NFL Combine

New York Giants
On April 27, 2013, he signed with the New York Giants as an undrafted free agent following the 2013 NFL Draft.

New York Jets
On May 15, 2013, he was claimed off waivers by New York Jets. He was waived on August 4, 2013. Upon clearing waivers, he was placed on the Jets' injured reserve list. Davis was released with an injury settlement on August 23, 2013.

Kansas City Chiefs
Marcus Davis signed to a deal with the Kansas City Chiefs during the offseason.

Saskatchewan Roughriders
Davis signed with the Saskatchewan Roughriders on September 9, 2015 and played in his first and only CFL game on October 31, 2015 where he had two catches for 11 yards. He was re-signed after the 2015 season, but was released during 2016 training camp on June 6, 2016.

References

External links
Virginia Tech bio
New York Jets bio

1989 births
Living people
New York Jets players
American football wide receivers
Virginia Tech Hokies football players